Bonane or Bunane is a small village in County Kerry, Ireland, approximately 10 kilometres from Kenmare.

Notable places in Bonane include Tulloha National School, the Bonane Heritage Park, St. Fiachna's Church, a chocolate factory and traditional farm and visitors centre.

References

External links
 

Towns and villages in County Kerry